Juvenile Court is a 1938 American crime film directed by D. Ross Lederman.

Plot
Gary Franklin is a public defender and is frustrated that isn't able to save Dutch Adams from execution.  He tried to blame the environment Adams grew up in as the reason for his criminal activity.  Adams's sister, Marcia, tries to get the public funds to provide recreational places for impoverished neighborhood.

Cast
 Paul Kelly as Gary Franklin
 Rita Hayworth as Marcia Adams
 Frankie Darro as Stubby
 Hal E. Chester as Lefty (as Hally Chester)
 Don Latorre as Mickey
 David Gorcey as Pighead
 Richard Selzer as Ears (as Dick Selzer)
 Allan Ramsay as Davy
 Charles Hart as Squarehead
 Howard C. Hickman as Governor Stanley (as Howard Hickman)

References

External links
 

1938 films
1938 crime films
American crime films
American black-and-white films
1930s English-language films
Films directed by D. Ross Lederman
Columbia Pictures films
1930s American films